T.O. Bobe  (February 13, 1969, in Constanţa) is a Romanian poet and screenwriter for film and television.

He graduated in 1995 after studying literature at the University of Bucharest.

Between 1995 and 2003 he worked at the Teatrul Mic din București, where he began his work as a scriptwriter

He debuted with a poetry collection called Tablou de familie, published along with the poems of Mihai Ignat, Sorin Gherguţ, Răzvan Rădulescu, Svetlana Cârstean and Cezar Paul-Bădescu.

He also published the prose Darul lui Moş Crăciun in 2003 and Cum mi-am petrecut vacanţa de vară, in 2004.

References

External links
 
 T.O. Bobe at the Berlin International Literature Festival

Romanian poets
Romanian male poets
Romanian screenwriters
People from Constanța
1969 births
Living people
Male television writers